Rebender is a rural locality (a settlement) in Soldatsky Selsoviet Rural Settlement, Fatezhsky District, Kursk Oblast, Russia. The population as of 2010 is 14.

Geography 
The settlement is located in the Nikovets River basin (a right tributary of the Ruda in the basin of the Svapa), 96 km from the Russia–Ukraine border, 38 km north-west of Kursk, 13 km south-west of the district center – the town Fatezh, 12 km from the selsoviet center – Soldatskoye.

Climate
Rebender has a warm-summer humid continental climate (Dfb in the Köppen climate classification).

Transport 
Rebender is located 9 km from the federal route  Crimea Highway as part of the European route E105, 14 km from the road of regional importance  (Fatezh – Dmitriyev), 2.5 km from the road of intermunicipal significance  (Alisovo-Pokrovskoye – Kofanovka), 34 km from the nearest railway halt 552 km (railway line Navlya – Lgov-Kiyevsky).

The rural locality is situated 42 km from Kursk Vostochny Airport, 156 km from Belgorod International Airport and 237 km from Voronezh Peter the Great Airport.

References

Notes

Sources

Rural localities in Fatezhsky District